Candelario Duvergel (2 February 1963 — 17 June 2016) was an amateur boxer from Cuba. Duvergel is better known for winning 2 consecutive Pan American Games gold medals in the light welterweight division. Duvergel was renowned for his counter-attacking prowess. He won 8 Cuban national championships but he had trouble replicating his success in international competitions, despite regularly defeating other Cuban amateur champions like Juan Carlos Lemus. Duvergel defeated Shane Mosley in 1991. Duvergel never competed in the Olympics, as Cuba boycotted 1984 Summer Olympics and the 1988 Summer Olympics.

References 

1963 births
2016 deaths
Cuban male boxers
Boxers at the 1983 Pan American Games
Boxers at the 1987 Pan American Games
Pan American Games gold medalists for Cuba
Pan American Games medalists in boxing
AIBA World Boxing Championships medalists
Competitors at the 1990 Central American and Caribbean Games
Central American and Caribbean Games gold medalists for Cuba
Light-welterweight boxers
Central American and Caribbean Games medalists in boxing
Medalists at the 1983 Pan American Games
Medalists at the 1987 Pan American Games
20th-century Cuban people